is a junction railway station in the city of Hanamaki, Iwate, Japan, operated by the East Japan Railway Company (JR East).

Lines
Hanamaki Station is served by the Tōhoku Main Line and the Kamaishi Line. It is located 500.0 kilometers from the starting point of the Tōhoku Main Line at Tokyo Station, and is a terminus for the Kamaishi Line. Hanamaki Station is not a stop of the Tōhoku Shinkansen. The nearest Shinkansen stations are Shin-Hanamaki Station (6.4 km via the Kamaishi Line) and Kitakami Station (12.5 km via the Tohoku Main Line).

Station layout
Hanamaki Station has an island platform and a single side platform serving three tracks, connected to the station building by a footbridge. The station has a "Midori no Madoguchi" staffed ticket office.

Platforms

History
Hanamaki Station opened on 1 November 1890. The  (the forerunner of the Kamaishi Line) established its terminus at Hanamaki on 25 October 1913. The two stations were amalgamated on 20 September 1943. The station was absorbed into the JR East network upon the privatization of the Japanese National Railways (JNR) on 1 April 1987.

The station building was renovated in 2014 with a style evoking the early 20th-century Taishō period portrayed in works by author Kenji Miyazawa, with work completed on 21 September 2014.

Passenger statistics
In fiscal 2018, the station was used by an average of 3,287 passengers daily (boarding passengers only). The passenger figures for previous years are as shown below.

Surrounding area
Kitakami River
Site of former Hanamaki Castle
Hanamaki City Hall
Hanamaki Post Office
Fuji University

See also
 List of railway stations in Japan

References

External links

  

Stations of East Japan Railway Company
Railway stations in Iwate Prefecture
Tōhoku Main Line
Kamaishi Line
Railway stations in Japan opened in 1890
Hanamaki, Iwate